Tvøroyri Municipality (Tvøroyrar kommuna) is a municipality of the Faroe Islands with Tvøroyri as its administrative centre.

The municipality is one of 7 on the island of Suðuroy and covers most of the northeast portion.

It contains the following towns and villages:
Tvøroyri
Trongisvágur
Froðba
Øravíkarlíð
Øravík

Politics

Municipal council
Tvøroyri's municipal council consists of 7 members, elected every four years.

References

Municipalities of the Faroe Islands